Inland Township may refer to the following places in the United States:

 Inland Township, Cedar County, Iowa
 Inland Township, Michigan
 Inland Township, Clay County, Nebraska

Township name disambiguation pages